National Tertiary Route 601, or just Route 601 (or ) is a National Road Route of Costa Rica, located in the Guanacaste, Puntarenas provinces.

Description
In Guanacaste province the route covers Abangares canton (Las Juntas, Colorado districts).

In Puntarenas province the route covers Puntarenas canton (Chomes, Manzanillo districts).

References

Highways in Costa Rica